Vidi aquam is the name of an antiphon, which may be sung before the Tridentine Mass on Sunday, or either before or at the beginning (in place of the Penitential Rite) of the Mass of Paul VI according to the 2002 rubrics. It accompanies the Asperges, the ritual at the beginning of Mass where the celebrant sprinkles the congregation with baptismal water.

It is sung from Easter Sunday throughout the liturgical season of Eastertide until the feast of Pentecost. It replaces the simpler antiphon Asperges me, which is used outside Eastertide.

The text refers to the words of the prophet Ezekiel (Ezekiel 47:1), who saw the waters gushing forth from the Temple as a sanctifying flood that flows eastward through the earth and purifies the sea.

"And he brought me again to the gate of the house, and behold waters issued out from under the threshold of the house toward the east: for the forefront, of the house looked toward the east: but the waters came down to the right side of the temple to the south part of the altar."

The text also refers to the words of John the Apostle in The Gospel of John 19:34, who saw the waters gushing forth from the right side of Christ (The Temple).

"But one of the soldiers with a spear opened his side, and immediately there came out blood and water."

During the antiphonal hymn, the reference to Ezekiel 47:1 and John 19:34 is then followed by Psalm 117 and Gloria Patri. It is customary that during the Gloria Patri, those present should bow their heads in reverence for the Holy Trinity. It is not uncommon that throughout the liturgical season of Eastertide, the Priest will stop the sprinkling of the Holy Water to turn around and bow towards the Tabernacle.

Collectively, the entire antiphon translates to:

References

Christian liturgical music